The Scottish Reform Act 1832 was an Act of Parliament that introduced wide-ranging changes to the election laws of Scotland. The act was passed at approximately the same time as the Reform Act 1832, which applied to England and Wales. The chief architects of the Act were Francis Jeffrey and Henry Cockburn. It was subsequently given the official short title of the Representation of the People (Scotland) Act 1832. Prior to the Act, Scotland's electorate was only 0.2% of the population compared to 4% in England.  The Scottish electorate overnight soared from 5,000 to 65,000, or 13% of the adult men, and was no longer a private preserve for a few very rich families.

The Act did not substantially change the method in which the Scottish counties elected members of Parliament. As a general rule the counties each continued to elect one member. However, before the Act six small counties elected  an MP only in alternate Parliaments. This arrangement was ended, but a different solution was adopted for each pair of counties. Clackmannanshire and Kinross-shire became a single constituency. Buteshire and Caithness-shire were given a separate MP in every Parliament. Cromartyshire and Nairnshire were each united with a different neighbouring county, to form Ross and Cromarty, and Elginshire and Nairnshire.

Edinburgh and Glasgow now had two MPs; Aberdeen, Dundee, Greenock, Paisley and Perth one each. The remaining burghs combined in districts to elect 18 MPs, much as before; but now individual votes were added up among burghs across the constituency—in the past the MP had been elected at a meeting of representatives from each burgh. Boundary changes meant that a burgh for parliamentary elections might not have the same boundaries as the burgh for other purposes.

The effect of the Reform Act was considerable.  Before 1832 the Scottish Parliamentary electorate had been about 5,000 adult males. Following the passing of the Act,  the number of Scottish MPs increased from 45 to 53 and the franchise increased by an even greater proportion, growing from under 5,000 of the 2,300,000 population to 65,000 voters (now covering householders of £10 value in the burghs and property owners of £10 or tenants of £50 rental in the country seats). However the ballot was not secret and landowners could manipulate the property qualification by distributing nominal £10 parcels to multiple nominees who would follow the landowner's voting instructions.

See also 

 Reform Acts
 Representation of the People Act

References 

 Full original text of the Act as passed: 

1832 in Scotland
Acts of the Parliament of the United Kingdom concerning Scotland
Election law in the United Kingdom
Election legislation
Elections in Scotland
United Kingdom Acts of Parliament 1832
Electoral reform in the United Kingdom
Reform in Scotland